Baharon Ke Sapne (Dreams of Spring) is a 1967 Hindi film made under Nasir Hussain films' banner. It starred Rajesh Khanna and the Nasir Hussain fixture - Asha Parekh. It also had Premnath, Madan Puri and another Nasir Hussain fixture Rajendranath. Another pair of Hussain fixtures gave the music - Majrooh Sultanpuri the lyrics and composition by R.D. Burman. It is mostly a black-and-white film, except for one dream sequence:  the song "Kya Janoo Sajan" was shot in color. In Bahraon Ke Sapne, the response from the public in the first week of run forced the film's ending to be changed from a tragic one to happier one from the second week.

Synopsis 
In a small industrial town near Bombay lives Bholanath, who works at the local mill, and is the proud husband of Gauri, a daughter, Champa, and above all his son, Ramaiya, who is a graduate in the arts faculty, - the only one in this town who has attained this degree. But times are hard, and jobs are difficult to come by. When Bholanath loses his job, Ramaiya decides to find employment, and does so as a menial worker in the same mill his dad used to work. Ramaiya is very popular with his co-workers and they soon elect him as their new union leader. This puts Ramaiya in conflict with the Management of the Mill, headed by the owner, Kapoor, who has ordered that Ramaiya be eliminated post haste. But Ramaiya is determined to address the workers' grievances, and he gets himself framed for theft; has the police on the lookout for him, and so Ramaiya goes into hiding. When Ramaiya does not show up for a workers' meeting, some believe that he has been bought by the mill management, and they decide to take the matters into their own hands - by burning the mill down, killing Kapoor and his family, and getting into direct confrontation with the local police, who have been issued orders to shoot-at-sight. The original end, where Ramaiya was supposed to die along with Geeta, taking bullet from the leader of the agitation, but the response from the viewers forced the ending to be a happier one. In the end, both survive and the mill restarts.

Cast
 Rajesh Khanna as Ramaiya
 Asha Parekh as Geeta
 Prem Nath as Mr. Kapoor
 Rajendra Nath as Pandu
 Madan Puri as Ranjeet
 Sulochana Latkar as Gouri
 Nana Palsikar as Bholanath
 P. Jairaj		
 Anwar Hussain
 Ram Avtar
 Bela Bose as Guest Dancer
 Laxmi Chhaya as Guest Dancer

Production 
The film Teesri Manzil was originally supposed to be directed by Nasir Hussain and was to star Dev Anand in the lead. Another of Nasir Hussain's productions Baharon Ke Sapne was to be directed by Vijay Anand. However, on the occasion of Sadhana's engagement party, a misunderstanding erupted between Dev Anand and Nasir Hussain, when apparently, Nasir overheard Dev Anand saying "The film which Nasir is making with me is coloured and he has given Goldie some black-and-white film to make. Goldie is making the movie with some new boy, Rajesh Khanna". It was the next day that Nasir requested Vijay Anand to direct Teesri Manzil and offered to helm Baharon Ke Sapne, but specified that Teesri Manzil would not have Dev Anand in it. It was only then that Shammi Kapoor was approached.

Music 
The music for the movie was directed by R. D. Burman while the lyrics were written by Majrooh Sultanpuri.

Awards
Filmfare Best Cinematographer Award—Black & White Film--Jal Mistry

References

External links 
 

1960s Hindi-language films
Films scored by R. D. Burman
Films directed by Nasir Hussain